The Monroe and Toledo Railway is a defunct railroad which operated in southeast Michigan during the mid-1890s. The company was chartered on March 29, 1893, with the proposed object of constructing a line from the Flint and Pere Marquette Railroad's Monroe terminal to the Ohio border, just north of Toledo. On November 15, 1896, the M&T completed a line from Monroe to Alexis, north of Toledo. In 1897 the F&PM purchased the M&T outright.

Notes

References 

Railway companies established in 1893
Railway companies disestablished in 1897
Defunct Michigan railroads
Predecessors of the Pere Marquette Railway
Defunct Ohio railroads
1893 establishments in Michigan
American companies disestablished in 1897